Christoph Korn (born 1965 in Frankfurt am Main, West Germany) is a German audio and media artist working with diverse artistic forms of expression: Composition and Installation, video, text, net art and improvisation.

Artistic work
In the last few years, he has increasingly used the strategy of deleting and withdrawing.  As an example, see Waldstueck network installation

Web art 
 Waldstueck
 Hyperghetto
 Sorge und Kapitalismus

Releases

CD
 Oliver Augst/Marcel Daemgen/Christoph Korn (2007): Jugernd, TEXTxtnd/Deutschlandfunk Frankfurt.
 Oliver Augst/Rüdiger Carl/Christoph Korn (2005): Post Blank. Cover Art by Albert Oehlen. GROB, Cologne.
 Oliver Augst/Rüdiger Carl/Christoph Korn/Raymond Pettibon (2002): Blank meets Pettibon. Live from Philharmonie Cologne, Cover Art by Raymond Pettibon, GROB, Cologne.
 Oliver Augst/Marcel Daemgen/Christoph Korn (2001): An den deutschen Mond. Revised German Folk Songs, Deutschlandfunk/TEXTxtnd Frankfurt.
 Oliver Augst/Rüdiger Carl/Christoph Korn (1999): Blank, Cover Art by Günther Förg. FMP, Berlin.
 Christoph Korn/Wolfgang Schliemann/Joachim Zoepf (1999): AQTRZ, NUR/NICHT/NUR, Gnadenthal 
 Oliver Augst/Marcel Daemgen/Christoph Korn (1998): Brecht/Eisler, TEXTxtnd, Frankfurt.

CD/Compilation
 Christoph Korn (2006): „Wenn alles grünt und blüht auf Emslands Fluren“, „Wo das Lager steht“. In: O bittre Zeit, revised German Lagerlieder 1933 bis 1945, Papenburg. Award of „Deutschen Schallplattenkritik 2006“.
 On Kawara (2003): One Million Years, 32 CD Box. directed by: Christoph Korn/Oliver Augst. Der Hörverlag, Munich. Live at Documenta XI.
 Christoph Korn (1998): Ritornell. In: Roma Modulare, with Haberer, Kucharski, Lopez, Rüsenberg, di Scipio, Stein, Toop, Zingaro, Goethe Institut Rom/noteworks

LP
 Oliver Augst/Christoph Korn (2005): LONG LIVE THE PEOPLE OF THE REVOLUTION, cover art by Raymond Pettibon, with Raymond Pettibon, Otomo Yoshihide, Rüdiger Carl, eventuell/A-Musik Cologne.
 Oliver Augst/Rüdiger Carl/Christoph Korn (2005): DUDEN. Cover Art by Tobias Rehberger, eventuell/A-Musik Köln.

Film/DVD video
 Jürgen Heiter (2007): Der Photograph. with: Benjamin Katz, Georg Baselitz, Oliver Augst, Rüdiger Carl, Christoph Korn, Joachim Blüher, Anna und Bernhard Johannes Blume, Jan Hoet, Ora Katz, Walther König, Ralf Küpper, Markus Lüpertz, Jonathan Meese, Werner Nekes, Rudolf Springer, Maria Anna Tappeiner, Cony Theis, Rosemarie Trockel, Verdi-Quartett, Andreas Walther 
 Oliver Augst/Rüdiger Carl/Christoph Korn (2006): Blank plays Duden. Covert Art by Günther Förg and Tobias Rehberger, TEXTxtnd/Revolver, Frankfurt 
 Christoph Korn (2005): Stern. In: Lisboa.Reloaded. With: Carlos Alberto Augusto, Michael Rüsenberg, Hans Ulrich Werner, Carlos Zingaro. Real Ambient, Cologne

Film music
 Christine Reeh (2006): Waiting for Europe. documentary, 58min. music: Christoph Korn. Portugal.
Grand prize- Erasmus EuroMedia Award 2007 (Austria).
 Christine Reeh (2000): Exile. 43 min. Documentary. music: Christoph Korn.  ESTC/HFF Munich.

Texts
 Christoph Korn (2007): Writings on sound. In: Field Notes, Gruenrekorder Online Magazin, First Issue. www.gruenrekorder.de. Frankfurt.
 Christoph Korn/Lasse-Marc Riek (2007): series invisible, Revolver Books/Frankfurt and Selektion

Grants and scholarships 
 2008 Phonurgia Nova Award, Paris (in the category “Intermedia”) for “series invisible” by Christoph Korn/Lasse-Marc Riek, an audio work based on deletion processes 
 2009 Prix Ars Electronia, Honorary Mention (Digital Musics) for www.waldstueck.net
 2011 Stipend and Residency at the German Study Centre in Venice, Italy

Citations

Sources 
 blank
 Transmediale Berlin
 Phonurgia Nova, Paris
 art radio ORF, Vienna
 Centre Pompidou, Paris

German artists
New media artists
1965 births
Living people